The Sixth Asian Beach Games is due to be held in Sanya, China. Sanya would be the second Chinese city to host the Asian Beach Games, after Haiyang 2012.

Development and preparation

Medals
The design for the Games' medals was unveiled on June 17, 2020. The inspiration for the design concept comes from an ancient Chinese poem "The bright moon rises above the sea, bringing us all together at this very moment".

The front of the medal is a circle symbolising the brilliance of the sun and the moon; within the circle is the emblem of the Games and the image of the Tianya rock formation representing the history and culture of Sanya, decorated the rest of the medal and depicts the natural scenery of Sanya – the sweeping bays, waves and beaches. The back of the medal features the Olympic Council of Asia logo, highlighted by the dragon, falcon and shining sun, and the side of the medal is engraved with the phrase "Welcome to Tianya Haijiao" in English.

Venues

Tianya District
The four clusters, in the district of Tianya, includes ten sports venues. It was home to the Headquarters Hotel and the Sanya Phoenix International Airport.
 Haihong Square – sailing
 Haiyue Square – aquathlon, open water swimming, water polo, beach woodball
 Sanya River – dragon boat
 Tianya Haijiao – powerboat, sport climbing, beach handball, beach volleyball

In addition, a stand-alone sports venue was located in the district of Yazhou.
 Yazhou Bay – powered paragliding

Haitang District
The two clusters, in the district of Haitang, includes ten sports venues.
 Haitang Square – beach athletics
 Houhai – surfing

Jiyang District
A cluster, in the district of Jiyang, includes six sports venues. It was home to the Athletes' Village and Ceremonies venue.
 Dadonghai – 3x3 basketball, beach soccer, beach wrestling, teqball, ju-jitsu, beach kabaddi
 Sanya International Sports Industrial Park – ceremonies

The Games

Sports
On 11 April 2019, the Olympic Council of Asia initially announced that the Games would feature 19 sports in 22 Disciplines (Ju-Jitsu, Teqball and Woodball were added later).

Calendar
All dates are CST (UTC+8)

Marketing

Logo
The emblem features blue, green, yellow and orange colour blocks shaped into the number 6 to represent the sixth edition of the Asian Beach Games.

The image of a coconut tree, an athlete and a deer combines the concept of ocean, beach, sport and the tropical landscape together with the symbol of Sanya city. The shining sun emblem of the OCA is prominent in the design.

The English slogan “See Ya in Sanya!” is a short, youthful and friendly catchphrase for visitors from all over Asia and beyond. It represents the relaxed and family-oriented concept of the beach and sea sports festival.

Mascot
The mascot of the games is an Eld's deer in beach clothing called Yaya (亚亚). The first character of the name comes from Sanya (三亚), and the second one from Yazhou(亚洲), which is the Chinese word for Asia, representing the dynamic, interconnected and inter-dependent relationship among Sanya, Asia and other parts of the world.

Sponsors
Prestige partners
 Industrial and Commercial Bank of China

See also
2012 Asian Beach Games
2021 Asian Youth Games

Notes

References

External links

 
2023
Beach Games
2023 in multi-sport events
Asian Beach Games
Asian Beach Games
Asian Beach Games
Multi-sport events in China
Sports events postponed due to the COVID-19 pandemic
Scheduled multi-sport events